Ee Yugam is a 1983 Indian Malayalam film, directed by N. P. Suresh and produced by Purushan Alappuzha. The film stars Prem Nazir, Srividya, Hari and Rohini in the lead roles. The film has musical score by A. T. Ummer.

Cast

Prem Nazir as Dr. Prasad
Srividya as Aparna
Hari
Rohini
Kalaranjini
Sukumaran as Soman
Balan K. Nair as Nair
Janardanan
Cochin Haneefa
Kundara Johnny as Vaasu
M. G. Soman as sukumaran
Mala Aravindan
Meena as Lakshmi
Ranipadmini as Madhavi 
Sabitha Anand
Sathyakala as Prema 
Shanavas as Prasad
Usharani as  Ammu
 Lalithasree
Kaduvakulam Antony as Pappan
 P.K Radadevi
 Nithya as Geetha
 Rajashekharan as Mathew

Soundtrack
The music was composed by A. T. Ummer and the lyrics were written by Koorkkancheri Sugathan and Poovachal Khader.

References

External links
 

1983 films
1980s Malayalam-language films
Films directed by N. P. Suresh